Gregory Edward Marshall (born September 9, 1956) is the head coach for the University of Toronto Varsity Blues football team (OUA). He played professionally as a defensive end for the Ottawa Rough Riders for nine years where he was named the league's Most Outstanding Defensive Player in 1983.

Playing career
Marshall played college football with the Oregon State Beavers as a defensive tackle.  He was drafted in the seventh round of the 1978 NFL Draft by the Philadelphia Eagles, but ended up playing in two games for the Baltimore Colts that season.  Marshall later played in the CFL for nine seasons as a defensive end for the Ottawa Rough Riders.

Coaching career
After his playing career ended, Marshall ventured into coaching semi-professional football.  In 1990, Marshall served as head coach for the Ottawa Bootleggers of the Empire Football League.  The next three years, he served as head coach for the Ottawa Sooners of the Canadian Junior Football League.

Marshall began his CFL coaching career with the Saskatchewan Roughriders in 1994, spending the next six seasons with them as their defensive co-ordinator and defensive line coach.

In 2000, Marshall spent the next five seasons with the Edmonton Eskimos, initially as their defensive line coach, then later as their defensive co-ordinator.

In 2005, Marshall served as the defensive co-ordinator and assistant head coach for the Ottawa Renegades.  This season would ultimately end up being the Renegades final season before the team suspended their operations.

In 2006, Marshall joined the Winnipeg Blue Bombers as their defensive line coach and defensive co-ordinator, a position he held for the next three seasons.

On January 13, 2009, the Hamilton Tiger-Cats announced the hiring of Marshall as their new defensive co-ordinator and assistant head coach.

On January 5, 2011, it was announced that Marshall had been hired by the Saskatchewan Roughriders to replace Ken Miller as head coach of the club. After a 1–7 start to the 2011 season, the Roughriders fired Marshall on August 19, 2011.

On January 25, 2013, Marshall was named the defensive coordinator of the Edmonton Eskimos.

Marshall served as the defensive coordinator for Queen's Gaels football from 2014 to 2017. His defense found success throughout his tenure, including an OUA conference leading 16 fumble recoveries in 2014 and the conference's second best pass defense in 2016.

On January 3, 2018, Marshall became the head coach for the Toronto Varsity Blues football team of U Sports.

CFL coaching record

Personal life
Marshall and his wife, Cindy, have four children and one grandson.

References

External links
 Toronto Varsity Blues bio
 Edmonton Eskimos bio 
 
 DatabaseFootball.com profile
 QMI Agency article, Marshall gets Riders coaching gig (January 1, 2011)

1956 births
Living people
American players of Canadian football
American football defensive tackles
Canadian football defensive linemen
Baltimore Colts players
Edmonton Elks coaches
Hamilton Tiger-Cats coaches
Oregon State Beavers football players
Ottawa Renegades coaches
Ottawa Rough Riders players
Saskatchewan Roughriders coaches
Winnipeg Blue Bombers coaches
Canadian Football League Most Outstanding Defensive Player Award winners
Sportspeople from Beverly, Massachusetts
Players of American football from Massachusetts
Toronto Varsity Blues football coaches